Willem Ofori-Appiah (born 19 February 1994) is a Belgian former footballer who played as a left back.

Club career

KRC Genk
Ofori-Appiah played in the youth setup of KRC Genk until 2014. On 31 January 2014, the last day of the winter transfer period he was loaned to Dessel Sport. He made his debut for Dessel on 8 March 2014 in the match against VC Westerlo, Ofori-Appiah played the whole game. He would eventually play in 7 games of the 2014-15 season. He went on to join MVV Maastricht on loan and eventually played 15 times before being released by Genk upon his return.

Roda JC
He signed for Eredivisie side Roda JC in the summer of 2016
and on 28 November 2015 he made his debut in a 3-0 defeat against SC Heerenveen.

On 27 July 2017 he joined English League Two side Grimsby Town on trial.

Statistics

References

External links

1994 births
Belgian people of Ghanaian descent
Living people
Belgian footballers
Black Belgian sportspeople
Association football defenders
K.R.C. Genk players
K.F.C. Dessel Sport players
MVV Maastricht players
Roda JC Kerkrade players
Sporting Hasselt players
K. Patro Eisden Maasmechelen players
Challenger Pro League players
Eerste Divisie players
Eredivisie players
Belgian expatriate footballers
Expatriate footballers in the Netherlands
Belgian expatriate sportspeople in the Netherlands
Expatriate footballers in France
Belgian expatriate sportspeople in France
People from Heusden-Zolder
Footballers from Limburg (Belgium)